Ibolya Dávid (born 1954 in Baja, Hungary) is a Hungarian lawyer, politician, she was the president of the Hungarian Democratic Forum (MDF) between 1999 and 2010. Dávid was the Hungarian Minister of Justice between 1998 and 2002. She was the only female Minister in the government of Viktor Orbán. After  the MDF fraction was disbanded, Dávid was a member of the Hungarian Parliament as an independent. Dávid made the controversial decision to nominate Lajos Bokros, a former minister in Gyula Horn's MSZP government, to the European Parliament election on the MDF party list which led to some members leaving the party.

In the 2010 parliamentary election the Hungarian Democratic Forum continued its downward trend and  missed the 5% electoral threshold, leaving it shut out of parliament. Ibolya Dávid resigned on 11 April 2010, after the first round. Károly Herényi became her acting successor.

References

 MTI Ki Kicsoda 2009, Magyar Távirati Iroda Zrt., Budapest, 2008, 237. old., ISSN 1787-288X
 Dávid Ibolya országgyűlési adatlapja

1954 births
Living people
Hungarian Democratic Forum politicians
Members of the National Assembly of Hungary (1990–1994)
Members of the National Assembly of Hungary (1994–1998)
Members of the National Assembly of Hungary (1998–2002)
Members of the National Assembly of Hungary (2002–2006)
Members of the National Assembly of Hungary (2006–2010)
Women members of the National Assembly of Hungary
Justice ministers of Hungary
Women government ministers of Hungary
20th-century Hungarian women politicians
21st-century Hungarian women politicians
Female justice ministers